The Altai is a horse breed developed in the Altai Mountains of Central Asia. This is one of the most ancient horse breeds of Siberia.

Characteristics 
The Altai has a head with a slightly dished profile, set on a relatively short neck. They have a strong back, a well-developed croup, and short cannon bones. They stand an average of 13.2–13.3 hands high, and their coat colors are chestnut, bay, black, gray, and sometimes leopard spotted. In his The Book of The Horse Vesey-Fitzgerald gives the following traits of the Altai: height of 129.8 cm, body length of 104.2 cm, chest circumference of 154.0 cm, and pastern circumference of 16.8 cm. While A Standard Guide to Horse and Pony Breeds provides with the following characteristics of an average mare: 13 hands high, length of barrel of 140 cm, girth of 160 cm, and pastern of 17.2 cm. 

The horses similar in measures to the Altai were found in the Pazyryk burials, dating back to 3rd century BCE.

Breed history 
The Altai is one of the breeds of Mongol origin and was bred as a utility bread to provide transportation as well as meat, milk, fat and horsehair. Their breeding has been influenced significantly by the harsh climate in which it was developed and the need for survival on only year-round pasture grazing. They were bred for the characteristics most needed by the mountain tribesmen and nomads, including strong cardiovascular, respiratory, muscular and skeletal systems. They are also sure-footed over steep mountain trails.

Crossing Altais with other breeds usually results in larger, stronger horses that still retain the healthiness and easy management of the Altai. In the past, the Altai has been crossed with Lithuanian, Russian, and Soviet Heavy Draft horses.

References

Horse breeds